The Treaty of Brétigny was a treaty, drafted on 8 May 1360 and ratified on 24 October 1360, between Kings Edward III of England and John II of France. In retrospect, it is seen as having marked the end of the first phase of the Hundred Years' War (1337–1453) as well as the height of English power on the European continent.

It was signed at Brétigny, a village near Chartres, and was later ratified as the Treaty of Calais on 24 October 1360.

Background
King John II of France, taken as a prisoner of war at the Battle of Poitiers (19 September 1356), worked with King Edward III of England to write out the Treaty of London. The treaty was condemned by the French Estates-General, who advised the Dauphin Charles to reject it.

In response, Edward, who wished to yield few of the advantages claimed in the abortive Treaty of London the year before, besieged Rheims. The siege lasted until January and with supplies running low, Edward withdrew to Burgundy. After the English army attempted a futile siege of Paris, Edward marched to Chartres, and discussion of terms began in early April.

Terms

The Treaty of Brétigny was ratified on 10 May 1360, by Dauphin Charles and six English knights at the Hôtel de Sens. On 14 June 1360, John II, a prisoner in England, ratified the treaty at a banquet attend by Edward III, Prince of Wales, and the other French prisoners from the battle of Poitiers. The finalization of the treaty would occur in Calais on 24 October 1360.

By virtue of this treaty, Edward III obtained, besides Guyenne and Gascony, Poitou, Saintonge and Aunis, Agenais, Périgord, Limousin, Quercy, Bigorre, the countship of Gauré, Angoumois, Rouergue, Montreuil-sur-Mer, Ponthieu, Calais, Sangatte, Ham and the countship of Guînes. The king of England was to hold these free and clear, without doing homage for them. Furthermore, the treaty established that title to 'all the islands that the King of England now holds' would no longer be under the suzerainty of the King of France. The title Duke of Aquitaine was abandoned in favour of Lord of Aquitaine.

On his side, the King of England renounced all claims to the French throne. The terms of Brétigny were meant to untangle the feudal responsibilities that had caused so much conflict, and, as far as the English were concerned, would concentrate English territories in an expanded version of Aquitaine. England also restored the rights of the Bishop of Coutances to Alderney, which had been stripped from them by the King of England in 1228.

John II had to pay three million écus for his ransom, and would be released after he paid one million. The occasion was the first minting of the franc, equivalent to one livre tournois (twenty sous). As a guarantee for the payment of his ransom, John gave as hostages two of his sons, Louis I, Duke of Anjou and John, Duke of Berry, several princes and nobles, four inhabitants of Paris, and two citizens from each of the nineteen principal towns of France.

Breakdown
While the hostages were held, John returned to France to try to raise funds to pay the ransom. In 1362, John's son, Louis of Anjou, a hostage in English-held Calais, escaped captivity. Thus, with his stand-in hostage gone, John felt honour-bound to return to captivity in England. He died in captivity in 1364 and was succeeded by his son, Charles V. In 1369, on the pretext that Edward III had failed to observe the terms of the treaty, the king of France declared war once again.

By the time of the 1376 death of the Black Prince and the 1377 death of Edward III, English forces had been pushed back into their territories in the southwest, around Bordeaux.

Legacy
The treaty did not lead to lasting peace, but procured nine years' respite from the Hundred Years' War. In the following years, French forces were involved in battles against the Anglo-Navarrese (Bertrand du Guesclin's victory at Cocherel on 16 May 1364) and the Bretons.

See also

List of treaties
Treaty of Troyes

Notes

References

Sources

Bretigny, Treaty of
Eure-et-Loir
1360s in France
Bretigny
Treaties of medieval England
Treaties of the Kingdom of France
1360 in England
History of Centre-Val de Loire
Edward III of England
Hundred Years' War, 1337–1360